The 2017–18 Richmond Spiders women's basketball team represents the University of Richmond during the 2017–18 NCAA Division I women's basketball season. The Spiders, led by thirteenth year head coach Michael Shafer, play their home games at the Robins Center and were members of the Atlantic 10 Conference. They finished the season 14–17, 8–8 in A-10 play to finish in eighth place. They advanced to the quarterfinals of the A-10 women's tournament where they lost to Dayton.

2017–18 media
All Spiders games are broadcast on WTVR 6.3 with Robert Fish on the call. The games are also streamed on Spider TV .

Roster

Schedule

|-
!colspan=9 style=| Non-conference regular season

|-
!colspan=9 style=| Atlantic 10 regular season

|-
!colspan=9 style=| Atlantic 10 Tournament

Rankings
2017–18 NCAA Division I women's basketball rankings

See also
 2017–18 Richmond Spiders men's basketball team

References

Richmond Spiders women's basketball seasons
Richmond
Richmond Spiders women's basketball
Richmond